Song Keda (5 July 1928 – 17 September 1995) was a lieutenant general (zhongjiang) of the People's Liberation Army (PLA). He was a delegate to the 6th National People's Congress. He was an alternate member of the 13th Central Committee of the Chinese Communist Party and a member of the 14th Central Committee of the Chinese Communist Party.

Biography
Song was born Song Chongkuan in Yancheng County (now Yancheng), Jiangsu, on 5 July 1928. 

He enlisted in the New Fourth Army in August 1944, and joined the Chinese Communist Party (CCP) in March 1945. He served in the 39th Group Army before being transferred to Shenyang Military Region in 1954. In 1964, he was reassigned to the 39th Group Army, where he was promoted to become deputy director of its Political Department in 1970 and political commissar in May 1983. In June 1985, he became deputy political commissar of Shenyang Military Region, rising to political commissar in November 1987. He attained the rank of lieutenant general (zhongjiang) in September 1988.

On 17 September 1995, he died of an illness in Shenyang, Liaoning, at the age of 67.

References

1928 births
1995 deaths
People from Yancheng
Central Party School of the Chinese Communist Party alumni
People's Liberation Army generals from Jiangsu
People's Republic of China politicians from Jiangsu
Chinese Communist Party politicians from Jiangsu
Delegates to the 6th National People's Congress
Alternate members of the 13th Central Committee of the Chinese Communist Party
Members of the 14th Central Committee of the Chinese Communist Party